The Great Derangement: A Terrifying True Story of War, Politics, and Religion at the Twilight of the American Empire is a 2008 non-fiction book by Matt Taibbi, published by Spiegel & Grau on May 6, 2008.

Summary
In the book, Taibbi recounts his travels in the months leading up to the 2008 United States presidential election. He covers his trips to Iraq, the United States Congress, a meeting of the 9/11 Truth movement and his time undercover as a born-again Christian in John Hagee's Cornerstone Church in Texas.

Taibbi discusses 9/11 conspiracy theories as symptomatic of what he calls the "derangement" of American society; a disconnection from reality due to widespread "disgust with our political system". Drawing a parallel with the charismatic movement, he argues that both "chose to battle bugbears that were completely idiotic, fanciful, and imaginary", instead of taking control of their own lives. While critical, Taibbi explains that 9/11 conspiracy theories are different from "Clinton-era black-helicopter paranoia", and constitute more than "a small, scattered group of nutcases ... they really were, just as they claim to be, almost everyone you meet."

In an interview with Slate, Taibbi explained the book's title:

Promotion
Taibbi appeared on The Daily Show on May 27, 2008, to promote the book. He spoke with host Jon Stewart about his time as a member of John Hagee's church and a 9/11 conspiracy group.

Reception
Kirkus Reviews said, "Taibbi displays a Hunter S. Thompson-esque knack for poisoned jabs at America's complacent underbelly" but added that "Taibbi fails to weave together these wavering strands."

Publishers Weekly said, "Thoughtful Democrats, Republicans and independents will find common ground in this book that punctures pretense, hypocrisy and know-nothingness."

Steve Appleford, writing for the Los Angeles Times, praised the book, saying, "This book is no rant. At times, it's even a little sad. The connections between all these corners of madness and corruption are not always clear, and the reality of mass indifference is not part of his calculations. But it's a fascinating and usually hilarious study, fueled by Taibbi's own brand of paranoia, reflecting a cruel light on an America gone wild."

References

External links
After Words interview with Taibbi on The Great Derangement, May 24, 2008, C-SPAN

2008 non-fiction books
Books about politics of the United States
Books by Matt Taibbi
English-language books
Aftermath of the September 11 attacks
9/11 conspiracy theories
Books about the 2003 invasion of Iraq
Evangelicalism in the United States
Spiegel & Grau books